Nagullanka is a village in East Godavari district of the Indian state of Andhra Pradesh. It is located in P.Gannavaram mandal.

Geography 
Nagullanka covers a vast portion of the delta area of the Godavari river. This village is located on the north-east coast of Andhra Pradesh. It is bounded by Amalapuram on the north and by  Bay of Bengal on the south and by  West Godavari district on the west. It is situated between the northern latitudes of 16* 30' and 18* and between 81* 30' and 82* 30' of the eastern longitudes. Nagullanka village is verry good natural village.

References

External links 

Villages in East Godavari district